The Burlington Bay James N. Allan Skyway, originally called the Burlington Bay Skyway and simply known as the Burlington Skyway, is a pair of high-level freeway bridges (built in 1958 and 1985) spanning the Burlington Bay Canal. The Skyway, as it is locally known, is located in Hamilton and Burlington, Ontario, Canada, and is part of the Queen Elizabeth Way (QEW) highway linking Fort Erie with Toronto.

1958 arch bridge

The first bridge (steel structure) was completed in 1958 and officially opened October 30, 1958, crossing the narrow bar separating Hamilton Harbour and the Port of Hamilton from Lake Ontario. This allows for Great Lakes ship traffic to flow underneath while four lanes of Golden Horseshoe road traffic may flow on top of it, neither disturbing the other. The bridge was designed by John Turner Bell.

The bridge had tolls when constructed, but these were removed December 28, 1973 after they were found to heavily impede traffic flow. The toll plaza was located near Tower's Drive. Truck drivers in particular had refused to take the tolled bridge since not only were they charged the full toll but also it took them extra fuel to ascend the Skyway. With the lifting of tolls on the bridge, trucks were then banned from using Beach Boulevard.

1985 twin bridge
When traffic volume became more than the bridge could accommodate in the early 1980s, the bridge was twinned. The 1985 bridge was a conventional precast concrete box girder. When the new skyway (concrete structure) was opened on October 11, 1985, traffic was temporarily rerouted to it so that the old bridge could be extensively rehabilitated and this work was completed August 22, 1988. Afterwards, there were eight lanes of traffic crossing the harbour.

The twinning project also saw a major upgrade of the freeway approaches to the bridge. The entire project resulted in the QEW being widened to eight lanes from Burlington Street to Highway 403, with modern Parclo interchanges at Burlington Street, Northshore Boulevard (former Highway 2), and Fairview Street/Plains Road. This section has a variable lighting system to overcome the frequent fog found in the area. It is also the site of Ontario's first freeway traffic management system which incorporates traffic cameras and changeable message signs.

Design
The 1958 steel bridge is a suspended deck through-arch truss bridge. The approach to the main span has elements of a through-truss bridge, but the arch shape takes the truss higher than the roadway deck, so hangers are used to suspend the deck from the arch truss.

A second bridge, completed in 1985, is  shorter. The roadway deck for each bridge is 30 m (97 ft) wide.

Naming
The original name of the first bridge was the Burlington Bay Skyway. After it was twinned, the proposed names of James N. Allan Skyway (in honour of the Ontario Minister of Highways James Noble Allan, who had championed the 1958 bridge) and James N. Allan Burlington Bay Skyway were rejected.  The official name since 1988 has been Burlington Bay James N. Allan Skyway.

Lift bridge
A federally owned low-level lift bridge, Burlington Canal Lift Bridge, linking Beach Boulevard in the Hamilton neighbourhood of Hamilton Beach and Lakeshore Road in the Burlington neighbourhood of Burlington Beach continues to operate. Built in 1962, the current bridge is the sixth bridge spanning the waters since 1830. This is mainly used by local traffic, although ramps from the QEW have been configured to allow easy access to the bridge and re-entry to the highway, should the Skyway bridge close because of high winds and adverse weather conditions, exacerbated by its towering height. The federal government attempted to transfer ownership of the bridge, but neither the province nor the Hamilton Port Authority were interested in assuming the estimated $2 million annual operating costs.

Refurbishment and events
In fall 2008, most of the older Aluminum Tapered Leg (ATL) overhead sign gantries (commonly referred by the MTO as a "Type 1" structure) which had been installed back in the late 1980s were replaced with the newer triangular truss gantries.

On July 31, 2014, a man driving a dump truck in its raised position crashed onto the top of the bridge frame on the Toronto-bound lanes. The bridge was closed for the weekend to make temporary repairs; permanent repairs to the bridge structure took seven months and cost $1.224 million. The driver was charged with impaired driving and tried in 2016, resulting in a conviction for dangerous driving in March 2016 and a one-year jail sentence.

See also
 Garden City Skyway
 Gerald Desmond Bridge, a 1968 through-arch in Long Beach with similar design
 List of bridges in Canada

References

External links
 

Bridges completed in 1958
Buildings and structures in Burlington, Ontario
Transport buildings and structures in Hamilton, Ontario
Former toll bridges in Canada
Lake Ontario
Road bridges in Ontario
Steel bridges in Canada
Through arch bridges in Canada
Transport in Burlington, Ontario
Transport in the Greater Toronto Area